Vinod Singh Bansal is an Indian politician from the state of Uttar Pradesh, India. Vinod Singh Bansal represents the Loni (Assembly constituency) of Uttar Pradesh.

In 2012, he lost an election for member of the Uttar Pradesh Legislative Assembly to the Bahujan Samaj Party candidate.

References 

Living people
21st-century Indian politicians
Bahujan Samaj Party politicians from Uttar Pradesh
Year of birth missing (living people)